Suddendorf is a village and a former municipality in the district of Grafschaft Bentheim in Lower Saxony, Germany. Since 1 November 2011, it is part of the town Schüttorf.

History
The name Suddendorf comes from the earlier form Zudendorpe, Zuden meaning “south” and dorpe – cognate with the English “thorpe” – meaning “village”. It was therefore descriptive of the village’s location south of Schüttorf.

Suddendorf has roughly 1,000 inhabitants in several settled centres and farms.

Politics

Mayor
The community’s honorary mayor is Karl-Ernst Kiewit.

Culture and sightseeing

Clubs
 Schützenverein Suddendorf (shooting club, founded 1886)
 Spielmannszug Suddendorf (band, founded 1950)
 SV Suddendorf-Samern (sport club, founded 1959)

Regular events
Each year in Suddendorf, a marksmanship festival, a children’s marksmanship festival, a Stoppelfest (literally “stubble festival” – a celebration of the harvest) and a Christmas market are held.

References

External links
Joint Community’s webpage
Community of Suddendorf

Villages in Lower Saxony